Thomas George Pett (born 3 December 1991) is an English professional footballer who plays as a midfielder for  club Port Vale.

Pett began his senior career at hometown club Potters Bar Town after progressing through the youth ranks to establish himself in the first-team during the 2009–10 season. He joined Wealdstone in January 2012 and helped the club win the Isthmian Premier Division during his  years with them. In June 2014, Pett joined Stevenage. He spent  years with Stevenage before joining fellow League Two club Lincoln City in January 2018. Pett helped Lincoln secure the League Two title during the 2018–19 season. Pett left Lincoln in May 2020. He rejoined Stevenage in November 2020, before signing for fellow League Two club Port Vale in July 2021. He helped the club to win promotion from League Two via the play-offs in 2022. He has also been capped at England C level.

Career

Non-League football
Pett began his career at Boreham Wood under the club's PASE youth system, spending just two months at academy level before moving to play in the youth system of hometown club Potters Bar Town. He broke into the first team and established himself as a regular in the starting line-up at Potters Bar during the 2009–10 season, and later captained the club. He was described as "one of the standout performers" for the following two seasons.

Pett was offered the chance to join up with Wealdstone midway through the 2011–12 season, who then played a division above Potters Bar, in the Isthmian League Premier Division. He accepted the offer and it was announced that he had signed on a permanent deal on 25 January 2012. During Pett's final season with the club, he scored 18 times as Wealdstone won the Isthmian Premier Division title. He credited experienced teammates Glen Little and Scott McGleish for this success. He spent two and a half seasons at Wealdstone in which he scored 29 times in 123 appearances in all competitions. Manager Gordon Bartlett said, "I can honestly say I always knew he would go on to play full-time football and I know he can make it in the professional game". Whilst playing for Wealdstone, Pett represented the England C team and was training to be a PE teacher.

Stevenage
Having spent time on trial with League Two club Stevenage, Pett joined the club for an undisclosed fee, on an initial one-year contract, on 23 June 2014. He made his debut on the opening day of the 2014–15 season, playing 88 minutes in the club's 1–0 home victory against Hartlepool United on 9 August 2014. Pett scored his first goal for the club on 6 September 2014, briefly restoring parity in an eventual 3–2 defeat to York City. He started the new year with two goals in three games, taking his goal tally for the season to four. This included a long-range 30-yard strike to double Stevenage's lead in a 2–0 away victory at York City on 17 January 2015. Pett scored with a "blistering strike" in a 1–0 home victory over Portsmouth on 14 April 2015, strengthening the club's place in the League Two play-off spots. The club went on to play Southend United in the play-off semi-finals, with Pett scoring in the second leg; Stevenage ultimately lost 4–2 on aggregate over the two games. He scored eight goals in 38 games in all competitions during his first season in professional football.

Pett signed a new two-year contract with the club on 13 July 2015. During the 2015–16 campaign, he was a first-team regular under new manager Teddy Sheringham as Stevenage finished that season in 18th-place in League Two. Pett made 43 appearances during the season, scoring once; his only goal of the season came in a 2–2 draw against Yeovil Town on 14 November 2015. He remained at Stevenage the following season under new permanent manager Darren Sarll, and made his first appearance of the campaign as a second-half substitute in Stevenage's 2–1 home win over Luton Town on 20 August 2016. Pett came on after half-time with Stevenage trailing in the match and assisted the winning goal. Thereafter, he was a regular starter in the team, scoring his first goal of the season in the club's 6–1 victory against Hartlepool United on 3 September 2016. He made his 100th appearance for Stevenage in a 2–0 defeat to Blackpool on 10 December 2016. Goals in home victories over Wycombe Wanderers, Leyton Orient and local rivals Barnet played a part in Stevenage's upturn in form, as Stevenage found themselves in the play-off positions before eventually finishing in tenth position. Pett made 44 appearances during the season, scoring six times. Shortly after the season had ended, Stevenage stated that Pett had been placed on the transfer-list after an agreement could not be reached between the two parties during contract extension discussions, with Pett's contract set to expire in the summer of 2018.

Despite being transfer-listed, Pett remained at Stevenage for the start of the 2017–18 season, scoring the club's first goal of the new campaign when he capitalised on a defensive mistake to open the scoring in an eventual 3–3 draw with Newport County on 5 August 2017. Pett went on to score seven times in 34 appearances during the first half of the campaign, including his first brace for Stevenage in a 4–1 win against Cheltenham Town on 1 January 2018. During his three-and-a-half years with Stevenage, Pett made 159 appearances and scored 22 goals.

Lincoln City
In January 2018, Pett informed Stevenage that he was going to be leaving the club when his contract expired later in June that year, which would have meant he would have left on a free transfer upon the expiry of his contract. Stevenage received a "significant five-figure" offer for Pett from fellow League Two club Lincoln City towards the end of the month, which was accepted. Pett agreed personal terms and subsequently signed for Lincoln on a -year deal on 31 January 2018. He made his Lincoln debut as a 61st-minute substitute in a 2–2 draw with Swindon Town at Sincil Bank on 3 February 2018. Pett scored his first goal for Lincoln in the club's 1–1 home draw with Yeovil Town on the final day of the regular season. Pett's goal, a 20-yard equaliser late in the second half, helped Lincoln earn the point they needed to secure their place in the League Two play-offs. Lincoln would ultimately lose to Exeter City at the semi-final stage, with Pett coming on as a substitute in both matches. He made 11 appearances for Lincoln during the second half of the 2017–18 season, scoring once.

Pett scored his first goal of the 2018–19 campaign in a 2–1 away victory at Macclesfield Town on 15 September 2018. He was named as the Professional Footballers' Association (PFA) Fans' Player of the Month for September. He made 51 appearances during his first full season at Lincoln, scoring four times as they finished the season as League Two champions. He suffered back problems ahead of the 2019–20 season and was then ruled out of action for up to six weeks with a knee injury, suffering a medial ligament tear. During this time he was studying mental health with Middlesex University, during which he was writing a dissertation. By the time he regained his fitness, manager Danny Cowley, who had brought Pett to the club, had departed and was replaced by Michael Appleton, who told him that he would not play in any further League One matches but would continue to train with the first team. His departure from the club was confirmed on 28 May 2020.

Return to Stevenage
Without a club at the start of the season, Pett rejoined League Two club Stevenage on 3 November 2020, on a contract until the end of the 2020–21 season. Pett made his first appearance since returning to Stevenage in the club's FA Cup first round match with Concord Rangers on 7 November 2020, assisting the first goal in an eventual penalty shoot-out victory. He scored his first goal since re-joining the club in a 2–1 defeat to Bolton Wanderers on 21 November 2020. Pett made 34 appearances during the campaign, scoring twice. Stevenage chairman Phil Wallace described Pett as "outstanding" during the player's second spell at the club, with Stevenage having improved from last place to 14th position in the League Two standings during his time there.

Port Vale
Pett was offered a new contract by Stevenage, which he did not sign after informing the club that he would be relocating further north. He subsequently signed a two-year contract with fellow League Two club Port Vale on 29 June 2021. With Brad Walker out injured, Pett was a composed presence as he established himself in a midfield holding role at the start of the 2021–22 season, whilst directing central midfield partners Tom Conlon and Ben Garrity to do the running work. He captained the team after Conlon was ruled out injured for the second half of the season. On 2 April, Pett suffered a grade three hamstring tear and was initially ruled out of action for up to twelve weeks; he credited the medical department after recovering within four weeks. He started in the play-off final at Wembley Stadium as Vale secured promotion with a 3–0 victory over Mansfield Town; Michael Baggaley of The Sentinel wrote that "[Pett was] calm, composed and classy in the midfield to help his side control the game".

Pett underwent an operation to fix a niggling spinal disc herniation in his back in the 2022–23 pre-season and had to regain his fitness during the early part of the campaign, whilst new signing Funso Ojo was in good form in midfield along with Conlon, Walker and Garrity.

Style of play
Pett is a reliable holding midfield player. Speaking in March 2023, he described his strengths as reading the game, winning the ball and making passes to transition the team from defence to attack.

Personal life
Pett has a Twitch channel on which he streams himself playing video games such as Call of Duty, FIFA and Football Manager. As of 2022, he was dating professional footballer Hannah Blundell.

Career statistics

Honours
Wealdstone
Isthmian League Premier Division: 2013–14

Lincoln City
EFL League Two: 2018–19

Port Vale
EFL League Two play-offs: 2022

References

External links

1991 births
People from Potters Bar
English footballers
England semi-pro international footballers
Association football midfielders
Boreham Wood F.C. players
Potters Bar Town F.C. players
Wealdstone F.C. players
Stevenage F.C. players
Lincoln City F.C. players
Port Vale F.C. players
Isthmian League players
English Football League players
Twitch (service) streamers
Alumni of Middlesex University
Living people